The English penny (plural "pence"), originally a coin of  pure silver, was introduced  by King Offa of Mercia. These coins were similar in size and weight to the continental deniers of the period and to the Anglo-Saxon sceats which had preceded it.

Throughout the period of the Kingdom of England, from its beginnings in the 9th century, the penny was produced in silver. Pennies of the same nominal value,  of a pound sterling, were in circulation continuously until the creation of the Kingdom of Great Britain in 1707.

Etymology
The name "penny" comes from the Old English pennige, sharing the same root as the German Pfennig. Its abbreviation d. comes from the Roman denarius and was used until decimalisation in 1971.

Idioms
Due to their ubiquity pennies have accumulated a great number of idioms to their name usually recognizing them for their commonality and minuscule value. 
These might include:
cut (one) off without a penny
mean enough to steal a penny off a dead man's eyes
not have two pennies to rub together
penny-pincher
penny-wise and pound-foolish
spend a penny
worth every penny

History

Anglo-Saxon silver pennies were the currency used to pay the Danegeld, essentially protection money paid to the Vikings so that they would go away and not ravage the land. As an illustration of how heavy a burden the Danegeld was, more Anglo-Saxon pennies from the decades around the first millennium have been found in Denmark than in England. In the reign of Ethelred the Unready (978–1016), some 40 million pennies were paid to the Danes, while King Canute (Knut) (1016–1035) paid off his invasion army with another 20 million pennies.

The penny initially weighed 20 to 22.5 modern grains (1.3 to 1.5 g). It was standardized to 32 Tower grains,  of a Tower pound (approx. 350 g). The alloy was set to sterling silver of .925 fineness in 1158 under King Henry II. The weight standard was changed to the Troy pound (373.242 g) in 1527 under Henry VIII, i.e. a pennyweight became about 1.555 grams. As the purity and weight of the coin was critical, the name of the moneyer who manufactured the coin, and at which mint, often appeared on the reverse side of the coin.

From the time of King Offa, the penny was the only denomination of coin minted in England for 500 years, until the attempted gold coinage issue of King Henry III in 1257 and a few halfpennies and farthings in 1222, the introduction of the groat by King Edward I in 1279, under whom the halfpenny and farthing were also reintroduced, and the later issues of King Edward III.

At the time of the 1702 London Mint Assay by Sir Isaac Newton, the silver content of British coinage was defined to be one troy ounce of sterling silver for 62 pence. Therefore, the value of the monetary pound sterling was equivalent to only 3.87 troy ounces of sterling silver. This was the standard from 1601 to 1816.

Pennies by period
History of the English penny (c. 600-1066)
History of the English penny (1066-1154) (The Early Normans and the Anarchy, 1066–1154)
History of the English penny (1154-1485) (The Plantagenets, 1154–1485)
History of the English penny (1485-1603) (The Tudors, 1485–1603)
History of the English penny (1603–1707) (The Stuarts and the Commonwealth)
History of the British penny (1714-1901) (The Hanoverians)
History of the British penny (1901-1970) (The twentieth century penny, 1901–1970)
Decimal Day, 1971
Penny (British decimal coin) (Post-decimalisation, 1971–present)

See also

Coins of the pound sterling
Sixpence

Notes

References
Coincraft's Standard Catalogue English & UK Coins 1066 to Date, Richard Lobel, Coincraft. 

Coins of England
Pennies
Silver coins

no:Old penny sterling
pt:Penny antigo